Padraic Kelly is a former Gaelic football goalkeeper who played for Offaly from 1994 to 2009.

He played with the Offaly inter-county team from 1994 to 2009 and with his club Shamrocks. He was part of the Offaly team that won the Leinster Senior Football Championship in 1997 and the National Football League in 1998.

His brother Séamus was also a keeper for UCD, Cardiff City, St Patrick's Athletic and Longford Town.

References

Year of birth missing (living people)
Living people
Gaelic football goalkeepers
Offaly inter-county Gaelic footballers
Shamrocks Gaelic footballers
People from Tullamore, County Offaly